Justice Eyre may refer to:

Giles Eyre (c. 1635–1695), English judge who served as Justice of the King's Bench
Samuel Eyre (1633–1698), English judge who served as Justice of the King's Bench

See also
Chief Justice Eyre (disambiguation)